The 2010 congressional elections in New Mexico were held on November 2, 2010 and determined New Mexico's representation in the United States House of Representatives. Representatives are elected for two-year terms; the winners of the election served in the 111th Congress, which began on January 4, 2009 ended on January 3, 2011.

New Mexico has three seats in the House, apportioned according to the 2000 United States Census. Its  2009–2011 congressional delegation consisted of three Democrats and no Republicans, which changed to two Democrats and one Republican after the 2010 election.

Overview

By district
Results of the 2010 United States House of Representatives elections in New Mexico by district:

District 1

Campaign
First elected in 2008, incumbent Democratic Congressman Martin Heinrich ran for re-election for the first time this year. This moderate district, based in metro Albuquerque, has a tendency of supporting both Republican and Democratic candidates for office. In the general election, Congressman Heinrich faced Jon Barela, the Republican nominee for the seat and a former high-ranking official in the New Mexico Republican Party. Barela hammered at Heinrich for being "too far left" for what he described as a "center-right seat." The Albuquerque Journal endorsed Jon Barela in the general election, citing the fact that he "would boost the economy by nurturing predictability for investors and job creators" and urging New Mexico voters to vote for a candidate who would "[help] restore balance to Congress and [place] an emphasis on people over government programs to right the ship." Polling indicated that the race would be close, and on election day, Heinrich won a second term by nearly a four-point margin and 8,000 votes.

Polling

†Internal poll (Greenberg Quinlan Rosner Research for the Heinrich campaign and Public Opinion Strategies for the Barela campaign)

Results

District 2

Campaign
This conservative-leaning district, which has historically supported Republican candidates for higher office, has been represented by moderate Democratic Congressman Harry Teague since he was first elected two years prior. The previous Congressman, Republican Steve Pearce, retired in 2008 to run for Senate, a race that he lost. Coming off from a large electoral defeat at the hands of Democrat Tom Udall, the former Congressman Pearce re-entered the political sphere and challenged Congressman Teague when he sought election to a second congressional term. A tough campaign ensued, with Pearce taking the lead in most polls. Pearce's advantage widened when the Democratic Congressional Campaign Committee announced that it was shifting resources from the 2nd district to the 1st district, a decision that the Pearce campaign responded, "The DCCC is realizing what we knew all along. Voters do not want the Teague-Pelosi agenda of out-of-control spending and lost jobs." In late October, Congressman Teague declined to participate in a debate with Steve Pearce, giving Pearce solo airtime that was broadcast statewide and providing some observers with evidence that Teague was essentially conceding defeat to Pearce. As political prognosticators indicated, on election day, Pearce defeated the incumbent Congressman and returned to Washington for his fourth nonconsecutive term.

Polling

†Internal poll (Hamilton Campaigns polls commissioned by Teague; Tarrance Group poll for Pearce)

Results

District 3

Campaign
Incumbent Democratic Congressman Ben Ray Luján has represented this liberal district based in northern New Mexico since he was first elected in 2008 to replace outgoing Democratic Congressman Tom Udall, who successfully ran for Senate. Seeking a second term, Congressman Luján faced Republican businessman Tom Mullins in the general election. The Albuquerque Journal endorsed Mullins, praising his plans to "trim federal spending" and "help the private sector create jobs…[by] lowering taxes." Despite this, however, Luján was able to use the district’s natural liberal leanings to his advantage and won re-election to a second term in Congress.

Republican primary

Polling

Results

References

External links
Elections from the New Mexico Secretary of State
U.S. Congress candidates for New Mexico at Project Vote Smart
New Mexico U.S. House from OurCampaigns.com
Campaign contributions for U.S. Congressional races in New Mexico from OpenSecrets
2010 New Mexico General Election graph of multiple polls from Pollster.com

House – New Mexico from the Cook Political Report

New Mexico
2010 New Mexico elections
2010